Welcome Race Fans is an independently produced studio EP by Seven Mary Three.  It was released in 2003 and was sold at the band's live concerts.  It was also used to showcase the band's new songs to secure a new recording contract.

Three of the EP's four songs appear on the band's subsequent album called Dis/Location, released in 2004.  This version of "Without You Feels" was used on Dis/Location, but the other two songs were rerecorded.  "Nobody Knows" does not appear on that album.

Track listing
All songs written by Seven Mary Three.
"Without You Feels" – 3:48
"Made to be Broken" – 3:26
"Oceans of Envy" – 4:17
"Nobody Knows" – 3:29

Album credits
Jason Ross – lead vocals, rhythm guitar
Thomas Juliano – lead guitar, backing vocals
Casey Daniel – bass
Giti Khalsa – drums

Production
Produced, engineered, and mixed by Sylvia Massy.

2003 EPs
Seven Mary Three albums